Step-Soci is a commune in Orhei District, Moldova. It is composed of two villages, Budăi and Step-Soci.

References

Communes of Orhei District